Stanton Hills is a group of loosely clustered nunataks centered 8 nautical miles (15 km) west of Mount Neuner, Behrendt Mountains, in southern Palmer Land. The hills extend over 12 nautical miles (22 km) and rise to about 1,300 m and were mapped by the United States Geological Survey (USGS) and U.S. Navy aerial photographs throughout 1961–67. The Advisory Committee on Antarctic Names (US-ACAN) named the hills after Lieutenant Commander Ronald A. Stanton, U.S. Navy, the command pilot of an LC-130 Hercules aircraft in support of the USGS geological party in 1985.

Nunataks of Palmer Land